Wheel of Fortune is an Australian television game show produced by Grundy Television until 2006, and CBS Studios International in 2008. The program aired on the Seven Network from 1981 to 2004 and January to July 2006, aired at 5:00pm from 1981 to 1989 and from 2004 to 2006 and at 5:30pm from 1989 to 2003, and is mostly based on the same general format as the original American version of the program. 

After Wheel of Fortune ended, the format was revived by the Nine Network in 2008 as Million Dollar Wheel of Fortune, until it was cancelled in June 2008 due to low ratings and following arguments from long-time host John Burgess concerning why he did not like the revamped format, which coincidentally was adopted in the United States later that year and has continued with the modified Australian format.  The rights to the show are currently owned by Network Ten, which now owns the video and format rights through its parent company, Paramount International Networks, which holds international rights as the American version is distributed by the company's broadcast syndication arm.

An earlier unrelated show also titled Wheel of Fortune had been broadcast on the Nine Network. That version had been developed by Reg Grundy as a radio game show before it transferred to television in 1959.

In 2010, hostess Adriana Xenides died after a long battle with illness; she had been listed in the Guinness World Records as the longest-serving hostess of a television game show until it was surpassed by her US counterpart, Vanna White in 2001.

History
In 1981, the Grundy Organisation purchased the rights to Merv Griffin's American game show Wheel of Fortune and created a faithful reproduction of the American series, as they had done with many other game shows. The new show began airing on the Seven Network on 21 July 1981 at 5:00PM, and was produced at the studios of ADS-7 in Adelaide and hosted by Ernie Sigley. The show's production moved to SAS-7 when ADS and SAS swapped network affiliations and channel frequencies at the end of 1987.

In 1996, as part of an attempted major revamp with the remaining of the show's famous theme music and sounds, the program relocated from Adelaide to Seven flagship ATN-7 in Sydney. Along with a new set, new music, faster game format and modified rules, John Burgess was sacked from his twelve-year stint as host and replaced by Tony Barber. By the time that Burgess' final episode went to air it had become common knowledge that the show had relocated and that changes would occur. However, Burgess' final words referred only to the show's relocation, thus suggesting that he was at the time oblivious to his sacking.

The following Monday after Burgess' final episode, Barber began as host, despite much controversy. Beside the fact that viewers did not appreciate the fact that Burgess was sacked without a chance to say goodbye on air, viewers had difficulty accepting the new rules and faster pace. Additionally, Burgess had made media appearances saying how he had been badly treated and only found out about his sacking accidentally when a Grundy executive had to cancel a golf date with him because he was needed at the studios to continue work on the new format.

The ratings for the first two nights appeared promising to begin with but plummeted badly from then on.  Some ground was regained after Seven and Grundy, in an embarrassing about-face, reinstated as much of the old rules as possible after the first five weeks.  It regained further ground presumably due to audience curiosity when Adriana Xenides took sick leave in November 1996, but neither moves were enough to return it to a credible position as far as ratings were concerned.

A 5pm nationwide newscast that replaced Family Feud on 1 July also proved fatal for Wheel and the network.  On 27 November 1996, the Seven Network issued a press releases in which Barber announced his resignation from the show. In his 2001 memoir Who Am I, Barber later explained that he was removed from the position by the network and was offered future projects with the network in exchange for agreeing to the press release. The future projects, however, never came to pass. Burgess has claimed (also backed up by Barber in his memoir) on many occasions that he was offered the job back with a heavy pay raise and declined, but the Seven Network denied this story. In any event, Burgess was quickly given a contract by the Nine Network to host the game show Catch Phrase (later retitled Burgo's Catch Phrase) that would be Wheel of Fortunes rival for a few more years.

Adriana Xenides, who had been the show's co-hostess and letter-turner since its premiere, fell sick — ultimately suffering from depression and what she called a "physical breakdown".

Barber appeared at the start of the 1997 series premiere to introduce and hand the show over to Rob Elliott with former Perfect Match hostess Kerrie Friend replacing Xenides for the next seven months.

On 18 June 2006, the Seven Network announced that they had stopped broadcasting of the program with the last episode airing on 28 July, just one week after celebrating 25 years on Australian television. The final episode was filmed on 23 June at Channel 7's Epping studios. One of the contestants on the final episode was Edith Bliss, former field reporter for Simon Townsend's Wonder World, who won the game and effectively became the show's final, undefeated champion. From the Monday following the final episode, the network filled the times-lot with reruns of M.A.S.H. Following the finale, Seven also aired 20 unaired episodes from 2005 at the 10am timeslot. These were hosted by 2004 host Steve Oemcke, and clearly produced before it was decided to rest the show in 2005.

2008 Nine Network Reboot and new title "Million Dollar Wheel of Fortune"
In May 2008, the Nine Network revived the show in a revamped form known as Million Dollar Wheel of Fortune, hosted by former Home and Away actor Tim Campbell, with Kelly Landry as co-host. and airing from GTV-9 in Melbourne. 

Despite an initial report stating that Burgess and Xenides disliked the show, Xenides gave positive feedback stating that it was "refreshing" and she loved the "... very cool colours ... and the opportunity of winning a million dollars, that's excellent." She also stated that John was "probably misrepresented."

Ratings for the new series were expected to top now-rival game show Deal or No Deal, broadcast on the Seven Network and to lead-in to the 6:00pm news. However, there were low ratings, although peaking at 700,000 viewers on the first night. From then, viewership went on a decline, and by the end of its short run, Wheel had on average 450,000 viewers a night, compared to the almost-1,000,000 watchers for Deal. Due to this steep ratings decline, the series was cancelled on 27 June 2008, after only five weeks on air.

Format adoption in the United States

Despite its short-lived run for five weeks, format owner and producer Sony Pictures Television later adopted the Million Dollar wedge format in the American syndicated version at the start of its 26th season on 8 September 2008, except the million dollar wedge is available in the first three rounds instead of the first round only.  Three players have won the prize.

Gameplay
Before the taping begins, the players draw numbers to determine their positions on stage. Play proceeds from left to right from the viewer's perspective: from the red player to yellow, then to blue, then back to red.  The red player would have the first spin in round 1, the yellow player would have the first spin in round 2 and the blue/green player would have the first spin in round 3. From 1999 to 2003 when the main game consisted of 4 puzzles, the red player would have the first spin in round 4.

From July 1996 until 1998, the host would ask a trivia question and the contestant who buzzed in with the correct answer would have the first spin.  During this time the red podium was reserved for the defending champion as there was an opportunity for any contestant to have the first spin. The process used during this period was a form of continuous play (For example, if the red player buzzed in to start round 1, but the yellow player solved the puzzle, then the blue player would have the first spin in round 2).

Upon conversion of the puzzle board from a set of 52 trilons to touch screens in 2004, the show used a Flip-Up puzzle (based on the American version; see below) to determine control of the board to start the first and fourth round, and among which the player clockwise will begin the next round and so on (in order, red, yellow, blue and red). Like the July 1996 – 1998 era, the red podium was reserved for the defending champion.

Categories
The game uses a wide variety of categories for its puzzles. Some are generic, such as "Place" or "Thing." Puzzles frequently refer to popular culture or common items encountered in everyday life.Starting In 1994‘BEFORE AND AFTER’
‘STAR AND TITLE’
‘STAR AND ROLE’
‘ARTIST(S) AND SONG’Starting In 1995‘BLANK’
‘CLUE’
‘SLANG’
'WHERE ARE WE?'Starting In 1999‘PEOPLE’

Other categories include BUILDING, LIVING THINGS, TRUE OR FALSE?, EVENT, and PHRASE.

Spinning the Wheel
The wheel has 96 pegs with 24 spaces that are each four pegs wide. These spaces represent values (in multiples of 5 instead of 50 in the American version), including one silver coloured “Top Dollar” wedge, prizes and penalty spaces, three strategic elements for use in the game.

A player who does not land on a penalty space asks for a consonant. If it is not in the puzzle, play proceeds to the next player. If the letter appears in the puzzle, the hostess reveals all instances of the letter and the amount spun up is added to the player's score.  Unlike the American version, however, the amount won is a flat rate and not multiplied by the number of instances of the letter. The only exception is when the red mystery letter appears, which doubles the amount spun up when called. Calling a letter that has already been called results in the loss of one's turn. A "used letter board" is positioned off screen for the contestants to see to aid in their guesses. All descriptions of players being credited with a value in the remainder of this article assume that the player calls a consonant which appears in the puzzle. A player who lands on a value is credited with that amount.

"Top Dollar" values
 1981-1985: $240 – $460 – $1,200
 1985-1990: $360 – $690 – $1,800
 1990-1994: $400 – $750 – $2,000 (first used on Episode #2,000)
 1995-2000: ($)500 – ($)1,000 – ($)2,000 (From 15 July 1996 until October 1996 and again from 1999 to 2000, 1,000 was used in rounds 2 and 3, while 2,000 was used in round 4)
 2000-2006: 750 – 1,500 - 2,500 (Like the previous amounts, 1,500 was used in rounds 2 and 3)
 2008: $750 - $1,500 - $2,500 (rounds 3 and 4)

From July 1996 to the end of the original run, the scores, while still referred to as "dollars", were kept in points.

Buying a vowel
A player who has sufficient banked cash during the current round may choose to buy a vowel prior to spinning the Wheel. The cost of the vowel, ($)50, is deducted from the player's score and all instances of the requested vowel in the puzzle are revealed, if any. The player's score is reduced by a flat ($)50.  If the purchased vowel is not in the puzzle, the player loses their turn in addition to the aforementioned cost. Multiple vowels may be purchased until either the supply of vowels is exhausted or the player's bank falls below ($)50; after which the player either spins the wheel or tries to solve the puzzle.

Special FeaturesFlip-Up/Toss Up Puzzles - Introduced in 2004, these gave control of the wheel to whoever solved the puzzle, but did not add any money to the contestant's score. The Flip-Up before the second round is a Prize Puzzle, awarding a prize related to the puzzle. On Million Dollar Wheel Of Fortune it was called Toss Up, while Prize Puzzle was renamed Cash Up because of a chance to win $500 after guessing the puzzle.Free Spin - Available only in the first round, the Free Spin wedge allowed a contestant to continue his or her turn in the event of solving a puzzle incorrectly, selecting a letter that is not in the puzzle, or landing on Bankrupt or Lose a Turn. From July 1996 the Free Spin wedge was replaced with a dollar space, and a golden token with black "Free Spin" text was placed at the top of a wedge.  Upon spinning it up, the Free Spin was awarded first, and then a letter was called for the dollar amount that the "Free Spin" was placed upon.  If the letter called was not in the puzzle, the contestant could use it straightaway to retain control or save it for later.Bankrupt -  The black Bankrupt space ended a player's turn and loses their score currently earned for the round. Any score won from a prior round was not affected by it.  From July 1996 to late 1998, the solving of a puzzle did not secure the score accrued up to that point in the game, and landing on it at any time of the game took the player's score back to 0, unless the host spun it up during the speed-up round.  Between 1981 and 1996, the Bankrupt space would appear once in round 1, and twice in rounds 2 and 3. From early 1996 until July that year, Bankrupt spaces appeared once only in each round.  From July 1996 until 1998, the second Bankrupt wedge was brought back for the final puzzle, and then from 1999 onwards a second Bankrupt was added to the round 2 template for the third puzzle.Lose a Turn - Ends the player's turn without affecting their current round's winnings. The Australian version is one of several foreign adaptations to employ multiple Lose a Turn spaces on a single template with a second Lose a Turn space appearing in Round 3 (or Round 4 from July–October 1996 and 1999–2006).Red Mystery Letter - Between 1993 and July 1996, and again from January 1997 to 2006, a consonant that appears in red on the puzzle board doubles the amount awarded for choosing that letter.Surprise Wedge – Introduced in 1995, the Surprise wedge featured a Mystery prize won by the contestant who picked up the wedge and solved the puzzle on the same round. After the show was moved to Sydney, the Surprise wedge was abandoned until 1997, where it would appear on a sporadic basis.Goodie - Used from July 1995 – July 1996, this automatically awarded a pre-determined prize to the first person who landed on it for the night.  This did not rely upon the contestant correctly guessing a letter, it was awarded for the spin. The concept was reinstated in October 1996 with the introduction of the Top Dollar Prize.Bonus Wedge - Introduced in 1994, landing on this space and correctly guessing a letter resulted in the contestant winning the bonus prize.  Originally a golden wedge with black text, the 1996 revamp saw it turn into a silver token with blue text at the top of a wedge.  It was later replaced at the beginning of the 1997 season by a full blue wedge and the word "Bonus" in glittery text. Bonus would always be added to the wheel at the start of the second round.  The Bonus wedge was scrapped in 2003 upon introduction of the Mystery Round, but was reintroduced in July 2006 for the show's final week.Top Dollar Prize - Worked the same way as the Goodie wedge. During the later months of the Barber era in 1996, the first person to spin up any top amount during the course of the night was awarded a small prize. Similar to the Goodie wedge, it was awarded for the spin, and did not rely upon the contestant correctly guessing a letter. Prizes ranged from CDs, videotapes, concert tickets, small packages (CD and concert ticket for example) and the electronic Wheel of Fortune game (which made by Tiger Electronics and licensed by Croner).Bonus Puzzle - Introduced in 1995, the Bonus Puzzle concept was embedded with puzzles that fell into the categories of Clue, Blank, and later Where Are We and True Or False. The contestant who solved the puzzle on the board was then given the chance to solve the Bonus puzzle for a ($)200 bonus.Mystery Wedge (Space) – Between 2003 and 2008, round two featured two 500 spaces marked with a stylized question mark placed on the wheel. If a player landed on one of these mystery wedges and correctly guessed a letter in the puzzle, said contestant was given an option to risk their current winnings by 'flipping' the mystery wedge (contains either a Bankrupt or a special prize which would be awarded if the contestant solved the puzzle), or take a 500 buyout. After one mystery wedge had been flipped, the remaining wedge functions as a regular 500 space.Car Wedge - Used fro. March 13, 2000 to August 9, 2002, this was a rather convoluted feature that seldom had any outcome. A contestant would need to spin the "car" wedge marked with the logo (such as Proton and Daewoo), choosing the correct consonant and pick the wedge up, then solve the puzzle without landing on the Bankrupt. The contestant have to do the process twice during the first three rounds in order to win the car. Million Dollar Wedge - Introduced in the 2008 revival, the wedge had a "$MILLION" two-pegged space sandwiched by two small Bankrupts. The wedge do not have a monetary value but requires the player to solve the puzzle during the round upon picking up. Unlike other prize wedges, the wedge remain in the contestant's possession throughout the entire game and is still susceptible to Bankrupt hits; the wedge enables a contestant to play for $1 million during the bonus round if the player wins the game with the wedge intact.

Solving a puzzle
From 1981 to 1996, money earned in each round was used to shop for prizes. Any remaining cash also counted towards the player's final score. In early 1996, however, only secured winnings counted. When this was removed in July 1996, contestants were given a set prize upon solving a puzzle. By the end of the year upon solving a puzzle, contestants could choose one of three prizes offered to them. This would continue until 2004 when it was reduced to two prizes.

For Million Dollar Wheel of Fortune, solving a puzzle allowed that player to bank any cash accumulated up to that point.

Speed-Up Round: Final Spin
At some point, when time is running short, a bell rings to indicate the Final Spin of the Wheel. The host spins the Wheel and all remaining consonants in the puzzle are worth the value of the spin. The player in control has his/her arrow determine the round's value. The players take turns calling one letter each including vowels (no cost/value). If the called letter appears in the puzzle, the player has five seconds after the hostess stops moving to try to solve the puzzle. If a player has a Free Spin, he/she can still use it to keep her turn in the speed-up round. Unlike the previous rounds, contestants may give multiple guesses within the time limit. On several episodes, there have been more than one speed-up round.

If a penalty space is landed, the host spins again until a dollar amount is spun.  If the host spins up the Bonus wedge, the first player to put a letter on the board gets the prize and the amount under the Bonus wedge is what every letter is worth.

The player with the highest total became the carryover champion; from January-June 1996, only winnings secured by solving puzzles determined the winner. After June 1996, the player with the most points won the championship.

Major Prize Round (The Golden Wheel)

After the winning contestant finishes the Final Spin round, he/she advances to the Major Prize Round. At first, the winner played for a major prize usually worth an average of $4,000. By 1987, the dollar values on the wheel were replaced with the names of major prizes with at least one wedge being a new car. The contestant is given help with the final puzzle in the form of consonants and vowels; they start with two consonants and one vowel to start with, plus an additional consonant for every ($)2,000 scored in the main game. Theoretically a maximum of ($)38,000, can be earned so as to call every consonant. The winning contestant then gets 10 seconds to solve the puzzle and win the prize. Contestants can make many guesses during the time limit so long it does not expire. If a champion failed to solve the puzzle, any score would carry over to the next episode; however, once a major prize is won, the value is reset back to zero. 

The round has sometimes tweaked its format. In the 1995 Family Week, contestants were given 5 consonants and vowel to choose from regardless of score.  In the 1997 Celebrity Week, contestants were given the common letters R, S and E, and then had to choose a further 2 consonants and a vowel.  In the 22nd Anniversary State Challenge of 2003, the winner of the grand final was given 5 consonants and 2 vowels.

Since its debut in 1987, there were two gold-silver car wedges on the Golden Wheel. On the 1,500th episode in 1988, an additional car wedge was added. On a few occasions, additional car wedges were increased by one each day it was not won. The car has never, however, regularly appeared on the wheel for more than three times.

On 15 July 1996, the Golden Wheel was briefly  replaced with a selection of five envelopes. The hostess would bring them over to the contestant, the contestant would pick an envelope and then the host opened it up and revealed what the prize was as opposed to revealing it after the round is over. This was retired around September 1996 and it reintroduced the Golden Wheel with a redesign which would later be used over the remainder of the original series.

From 2000 to 2004, a new progressive jackpot system was added in addition to the car wedges (most of which were from Proton and Daewoo). The jackpot starts at $2,000 with another $100 increasing to the pot every night it was unclaimed. Two "Jackpot" slivers were sandwiched on one of the "Car" wedges. The highest jackpot won was $25,000 (added to the car, a combined prize of almost $50,000). This, and the $5,000 prize on the 5,000th episode, was one of only two cash prizes offered on the show.

From 2004 to 2006, The Golden Wheel saw the number of car wedges decreased to two when it featured a Renault and finally three with a Mitsubishi until the closing of its run on the Seven Network.

In the 2008 revival, the standard top prize (white spaces) was increased to $200,000. The car wedges (purple spaces) also returned but only two spaces are in play. For the beginning of the series, the number of $200,000 wedges started at one and increases one for every night until it was won. The same procedure then occurred with the car wedges starting with two. If a player acquired the Million Dollar wedge in the main game, one $200,000 space would be replaced with the $1 million top prize.

Celebrity weeks
Occasionally celebrities play for home viewers, with those viewers earning the prizes and total of the amounts their winning celebrity spun during the game in actual cash. At the end of the week, all those winning home viewers were entered in a drawing to win a car.

There was also a weekly series airing Saturday nights in 1990 and 1991 called "Celebrity Wheel of Fortune".

The 5,000th episode
On 21 March 2006, "Wheel of Fortune" celebrated a major milestone, as its 5,000th episode went to air on the Seven Network. An extra element was added to the special show where contestants had the chance to win $5,000 in cash. Two yellow "$5,000" wedges were added to the Round 1 wheel. A third was added to Round 2's wheel. If a contestant was to spin it up and select a correct letter, they would have 5,000 added to their score, but to win the actual money, they had to solve the puzzle (in the same way as the Surprise and Mystery wedges). In Round 2, one of the contestants did spin up the "$5,000" wedge and the Surprise wedge and solved the puzzle, winning over $10,000 in cash and prizes for that round. The other $5,000 wedges were removed for Round 3.

Champions
Record-breaking champions include:
 Donovan Newton, $63,110 August 1996 (during the Tony Barber era)
 Dell Edwards, $68,000 12 July 2001 (amount unknown, rounded off)
 Moita Lindgren, $72,917 August 24 & 27, 2001 (mathematical mistake)
At the time of going to air, champion Luke Seager (2004) was the 4th biggest winner of all time, and the second longest champion in terms of nights on air represented. Luke credited his longevity on the wheel (10 nights) to the fact that most newcomers to the show did not comprehend the importance of controlling the wheel. His reign as champion still rates amongst the highest ratings period the program has ever enjoyed.

Presenters
Wheel of Fortune in Australia has had many hosts, hostesses and announcers through its long history. They include:

Hosts
Ernie Sigley (July 1981 - June 1984)
John Burgess (June 1984 - July 1996)
Tony Barber (July - December 1996)
Rob Elliott (January 1997 - December 2003)
Steve Oemcke (January 2004 - December 2005)
Larry Emdur (January 2006 - July 2006)
Tim Campbell (May 2008 - June 2008)

Co-hosts
Adriana Xenides (July 1981 - November 1996, July 1997 - June 1999)
Kerrie Friend (January 1997 - July 1997, as a long-term replacement for Xenides)
Sophie Falkiner (July 1999 - December 2005)
Laura Csortan (January 2006 - July 2006)
Kelly Landry (May 2008 - June 2008)

Announcers
Steve Curtis (July 1981 - December 1982)
John Dean (January 1983 - December 1985)
John Deeks (January 1986 - December 1995, January 1997 - July 2006)
David Day (January - July 1996)
Ron E. Sparks (July 1996 - December 1996)
Simon Diaz (May - June 2008)

Fill-in hostesses
Kerrie Friend (November 1996, one week; 1997, seven months)
Terasa Livingstone (November 1996, one week)
Cecilia Yates (December 1996, one week)
 Bridget Adams (December 1996, one week)
Sonia Kruger (1998, two weeks)
Tania Zaetta (December 1996, one week; 1999, two weeks)
Mel Symons (2003, two weeks)

TimelineJuly 1981: The first episode to air. At the time the studio was identical to the American version at that time.1984: Red, yellow, and green sunbursts replace the green glitter backdrop, somewhat similar to the red, yellow, and blue sunbursts in the American version. The puzzleboard design is unchanged and was later slightly remodified in colour.June 1984: John Burgess replaces Ernie Sigley as host.1989: The show changes its timeslot from 5:00pm to 5:30pm.Late 1992: Sunburst backdrops are replaced with cones and the green backdrop becomes turquoise. A new colour scheme for the wheel is introduced.June 1994: John Burgess celebrates his 10th anniversary as host. It wasn't until October that an episode commemorating the milestone was shot and aired. The celebratory episode the background also changed from blue to yellow as well.1995: The theme music and the show's logo are updated. The set background colour now changes back to blue. By the middle of the year, an illuminated light box used to display the puzzle's category was removed with the category now displayed as on screen graphics.January 1996: The 1996 season premiere commences with a new puzzleboard consisting of an extra row added to the existing three rows of trilons.  John Burgess has shaved the moustache, and David Day becomes the new announcer following John Deeks' departure to host Family Feud.  The champion is no longer the one with the highest accumulated score, he/she now needs to have secured the most cash upon solving a puzzle.15 July 1996: The show relocated to Sydney with Tony Barber replacing John Burgess as host and Ron E Sparks replaces David Day as announcer. A new set and its theme music with the wheel mounted on a 20° incline was unveiled.  Until late 1998, landing on a Bankrupt now expunges all the contestant's winnings regardless of the puzzles solved, and as such, the champion once again is the person with the highest accumulated score at the end of the last puzzle. The turquoise backdrop changes to blue. The Golden Wheel is replaced with envelopes, and the bonus round is played in front of the wheel instead of behind the wheel from the central podium, with a trend that would continue once the wheel was spun following the re-introduction of the Golden Wheel.19 August 1996: The former theme music is returned. An attempt is made to have both themes co-exist together with a derivative of the new theme music used to introduce the new contestants each night. The on-screen visuals now featured an on-screen timer display in the Major Prize Round.October 1996: Following the Family Week special, the main game reverts to a three-round format.  Top Dollar prize is introduced and a new prize-shop is introduced where contestants choose a prize out of the selection of three offered to them upon solving a puzzle. The co-existence of both themes cease in favour of the reintroduced theme music and associated sound effects..18 November 1996: Kerrie Friend becomes the first substitute hostess in the show's history after Adriana Xenides took a sick leave.6 January 1997: Rob Elliott replaces Tony Barber as host. Kerrie Friend returns to the puzzleboard as a long-term replacement for Adriana Xenides until July 4. John Deeks returns to the booth as announcer. The Surprise wedge and the Red Mystery Letter are later returned.May 1999: Sophie Falkiner replaced Adriana Xenides as hostess.13 March 2000: Car wedges are introduced on the wheel beginning its run with the Proton (later Daewoo in 2001) wedge. The top values are now tweaked to 750, 1500, and 2500 respectively. A progressive cash jackpot is added on the Golden Wheel, starting at $2,000 and adding another $100 each episode until the jackpot is claimed.13 June 2000: Wheel celebrates its 4,000th episode, and four car wedges are placed on the Golden Wheel.2003: The Mystery Round is introduced along with Mystery wedges, similar to the American version's namesake round first introduced a year prior. The Bonus, Surprise, and "car" wedges are retired in favour of the new round. 11 August 2003: The set background changes to purple with another update to the show's logo. The bonus round is now played in front of the video wall next to the puzzle board instead of in front of the Wheel, in addition, First episode in HD.9 February 2004: Steve Oemcke replaces Rob Elliott as host. The set is updated that is similar to the American version (at the time), with a revamped electronic touch screen puzzleboard replacing the trilons (similar to the American version which made the change in 1997), and eggcrate display replacing the seven-segment display, and the addition of Flip Ups and Prize Puzzles. The timeslot changes back to 5:00pm as part of the Wheel and Deal hour, with Deal Or No Deal taking the previous Wheel slot.Late 2005: Larry Emdur and Laura Csortan replace Steve Oemcke and Sophie Falkiner as host and hostess respectively after it was announced by Sunrise hosts David Koch & Melissa Doyle.30 January 2006: The show returns to air after a year's hiatus. The whole set is revamped with the remaining of the letters' font, the theme music and the wheel. Wheel moves to Pyrmont from Epping's studios, with another update of the set, such as a puzzleboard with a blue border that changes colour and features light animation, similar to the American version; the LG flat screen plasmas replace the Contestant Trapezoid backdrops that animate during events on the show, such as landing on Bankrupt, bell sound, or solving the puzzle, and the return of Surprise wedge.March 2006: The show celebrates its 5,000th episode with multiple chances to win $5,000.July 2006: The show celebrates 25 years on Australia television on 21 July, and ends its run on the Seven Network a week later on 28 July. 20 unaired episodes were aired featuring Steve Oemcke, Sophie Falkiner and the old set (see the 2004 section) from 2005, before it was shelved.May 2008''': Wheel of Fortune is picked up by the Nine Network now known as Million Dollar Wheel of Fortune'' and hosted by Tim Campbell. The show runs only five weeks on air due to low ratings and negative reviews, including one where Burgess and Xenides had an argument about why they both disliked the show. Despite the low ratings, the Million Dollar wedge (with one slight modification in that it can be picked up in the first three rounds) is adopted in the United States for the ensuing season in September.

See also

 Family Feud
 List of longest-running Australian television series
 The Chase Australia
 Letters and Numbers
 Sale of the Century (Australian game show)
 Who Wants to Be a Millionaire? (Australian game show)

References

External links
 
 
Wheel of Fortune at the National Film and Sound Archive

1981 Australian television series debuts
2008 Australian television series endings
1980s Australian game shows
1990s Australian game shows
2000s Australian game shows
English-language television shows
Nine Network original programming
Seven Network original programming
Television series by Reg Grundy Productions
Television series by Fremantle (company)
Roulette and wheel games
Wheel of Fortune (franchise)
Australian television series based on American television series